John Connelly is an American historian and professor at the University of California, Berkeley. His interests include modern East and Central European history, comparative education and the history of nationalism.

Awards and honors
 2001 George Louis Beer Prize, American Historical Association: Captive University: The Sovietization of East German, Czech, and Polish Higher Education, 1945-1956.
 2012 John Gilmary Shea Prize, American Catholic Historical Association: From Enemy to Brother: The Revolution in Catholic Teaching on the Jews, 1933-1965

Bibliography

References

Year of birth missing (living people)
Living people
21st-century American historians
21st-century American male writers
University of California, Berkeley College of Letters and Science faculty
Historians from California
American male non-fiction writers
Scholars of nationalism